The 2018 Ningbo Challenger was a professional tennis tournament played on hard courts. It was the sixth edition of the tournament and part of the 2018 ATP Challenger Tour. It took place in Ningbo, China.

Singles entrants

Seeds

1 Rankings are as of 8 October 2018.

Other entrants 
The following players received wildcards into the singles main draw:
  He Yecong
  Te Rigele
  Wu Yibing
  Xia Zihao

The following players received entry from the qualifying draw:
  Viktor Durasovic
  Saketh Myneni
  Sun Fajing
  Yusuke Takahashi

Champions

Singles

  Thomas Fabbiano def.  Prajnesh Gunneswaran 7–6(7–4), 4–6, 6–3.

Doubles

  Gong Maoxin /  Zhang Ze def.  Hsieh Cheng-peng /  Christopher Rungkat 7–5, 2–6, [10–5].

References

Ningbo Challenger
2018 in Chinese tennis